Barnwood Park School  is a coeducational secondary school located in the Barnwood area of Gloucester in the English county of Gloucestershire.

It was originally known as Barnwood Park High School for Girls, but was then awarded specialist status as an Arts College the school was renamed Barnwood Park Arts College. The school achieved the Artsmark Gold from the Arts Council of England in 2009. From September 2018 the school became coeducational and was renamed Barnwood Park School. Today it is a foundation school administered by Gloucestershire County Council.

Barnwood Park School offers GCSEs and BTECs as programmes of study for pupils.

References

External links
Barnwood Park School Official Website
Barnwood Park School Official Twitter
Barnwood Park School Official Facebook

Secondary schools in Gloucestershire
Schools in Gloucester
Foundation schools in Gloucestershire